Julio José Pleguezuelo Selva (born 26 January 1997) is a Spanish professional footballer who plays for Dutch club FC Twente. Pleguezuelo mainly plays as a centre back but can also feature as both a right back and a defensive midfielder.

Club career

Early career

Pleguezuelo was born in Palma, Majorca, Balearic Islands. In 2004, he joined RCD Espanyol's youth setup, after starting out at CD Atlético Baleares.

In 2010, Pleguezuelo moved to Atlético Madrid. The following year, however, he signed for FC Barcelona, being linked to Premier League sides Arsenal, Manchester City and Tottenham Hotspur during his spell at the latter.

Arsenal
In July 2013, shortly after turning 16, Pleguezuelo moved abroad and signed for Arsenal. On 11 April of the following year, after becoming a key unit at the club's under-18 squad, he signed his first professional contract.

Pleguezuelo established himself as the captain of the under-21 side during the 2015–16 campaign. He went on to lead Arsenal to victory in the 2016 U21 Premier League 2 play-off final which was won by 3 goals to 1 over Aston Villa.

Pleguezuelo made his senior Arsenal debut against Blackpool in EFL Cup on 31 October 2018.

Mallorca (loan)
On 5 August 2016, Pleguezuelo was loaned to Segunda División side RCD Mallorca, for one year. He made his professional debut on 7 September, starting in a 1–0 Copa del Rey home win against CF Reus Deportiu.

On 9 October 2016, Pleguezuelo made his debut in the second tier, playing the last nine minutes in a 3–0 home win against SD Huesca. After 15 matches and a subsequent relegation, he returned to his parent club.

Gimnàstic (loan)
On 31 January 2018, Pleguezuelo was loaned to Gimnàstic de Tarragona in the second division until the end of the season.

FC Twente
On 21 May 2019, Pleguezuelo joined FC Twente of the Eredivisie on a free transfer.

Career statistics

Club

Honours
Arsenal
U21 Premier League 2 play-offs: 2016

References

External links
Profile at Arsenal.com

1997 births
Living people
Footballers from Palma de Mallorca
Spanish footballers
Association football defenders
Segunda División players
Eredivisie players
RCD Mallorca players
Gimnàstic de Tarragona footballers
Arsenal F.C. players
FC Barcelona players
FC Twente players
Spain youth international footballers
Spanish expatriate footballers
Spanish expatriate sportspeople in England
Expatriate footballers in England
Expatriate footballers in the Netherlands